Kadomsky Uyezd was one of the subdivisions of the Tambov Governorate of the Russian Empire in 1779–1796. Its administrative centre was Kadom.

History
31 December 1796 Kadomsky uyezd was disestablished, Kadom became a city in Temnikovsky Uyezd.

References

Uyezds of Tambov Governorate